Angelmo Vyent (born 4 September 1991) is a Dutch footballer who plays as a winger or attacker for Zwarte Pijl.

Career

In 2012, Vyent signed for Dutch sixth tier side . In 2014, he signed for XerxesDZB in the Dutch fifth tier. In 2017, he signed for Dutch fourth tier club Capelle. In 2018, Vyent signed for AO Katastari in the Greek fourth tier. Before the second half of 2018–19, he signed for Greek third tier team Episkopi.

In 2019, Vyent signed for Albanian outfit Luftëtari, where he made 13 appearances and scored 1 goal. On 31 August 2019, he debuted for Luftëtari during a 1-3 loss to Teuta. On 1 October 2019, Vyent scored his first goal for Luftëtari during a 2-1 win over Turbina. In 2020, he signed for IFC in the Dutch fifth tier. In 2021, Vyent signed for Dutch eighth tier side Zwarte Pijl after trialing in Slovenia and receiving interest from Kuwait.

References

External links
 

Dutch footballers
Dutch expatriate sportspeople in Albania
Living people
Expatriate footballers in Greece
1991 births
XerxesDZB players
Derde Divisie players
VV Capelle players
SVV Scheveningen players
Ido's Football Club players
Episkopi F.C. players
Association football forwards
Expatriate footballers in Albania
Association football wingers
Dutch expatriate sportspeople in Greece
Dutch expatriate footballers